Wokingham Rural District was a rural district in the county of Berkshire, England. It was created in 1894. It was named after and administered from Wokingham, though this was a separate municipal borough.

Since 1 April 1974 it has formed part of the Borough of Wokingham.

Civil parishes
At the time of its dissolution Wokingham RD consisted of the following 17 civil parishes:

Arborfield
Barkham
Charvil
Earley
Finchampstead
Newland
Remenham
Ruscombe
Shinfield
Sonning
St Nicholas Hurst
Swallowfield
Twyford
Wargrave
Winnersh
Wokingham Without
Woodley and Sandford

 
Former districts of Berkshire
Districts of England abolished by the Local Government Act 1972
Districts of England created by the Local Government Act 1894
Rural districts of England